Members of the Tereshchenko family have achieved prominence in Ukraine and the world as businessmen, entrepreneurs, philanthropists, and landowners, beginning in the 18th century. The family has Cossack roots and comes from the city of Hlukhiv (now Sumy region), the former residence of the Hetmans of Left-bank Ukraine.

History
First guild merchant Artemy Tereshchenko was elevated to the hereditary nobility of the Russian Empire by a royal decree of May 12, 1870 for special merits and as a reward for charity. His three sons - Nicola, Theodore and Simon – helped run his business.

For over half a century, the Tereshchenko family - Nicola, Theodore, and their children - Alexander, Ivan, Varvara, Theodore, Nadezhda and others were engaged in charity activities, giving Ukraine numerous buildings, cultural and educational institutions, as well as art collections, now kept in museums of Kyiv, which were established by members of the family.

In the beginning of the 20th century, one of the largest joint-stock sugar companies in the south-western region was a "Sugar and sugar refinery factories' association of Tereshchenko Brothers", founded in 1870 by Nicola, Theodore and Simon Tereshchenko with an initial capital of 3 million rubles. Over time, the family-owned company had an annual turnover of 12 million rubles and independent access to the European market. Some of the factories remained in the individual possession of each of the brothers.

Members
Members of the family include:
Artemy Tereshchenko (1794–1873), Ukrainian entrepreneur, land-owner, establisher of sugar factories
Nikola Tereshchenko (1819–1903), Ukrainian philanthropist, son of Artemiy
Varvara Tereshchenko (1852–1922), philanthropist, married to Bogdan Khanenko (1848–1922), an art collector, a cofounder of the Kyiv Museum of Western and Oriental Art
Ivan Tereshchenko (1854–1903), a painter, son of Nikola
Mikhail Tereshchenko (1886–1956), a foreign minister in Russian Provisional Government, son of Ivan
 Petro Tereshchenko (1919–2004), son of Mikhail Ivanovitch Tereshchenko, chemist.
 Michel Tereshchenko, (b. 1954; Michel Terestchenko) French-born grandson of Mikhail ,son of Petro Mikhailovitch. He became a Ukrainian citizen in March 2015 after living in Ukraine for over a decade, and was elected mayor of Hlukhiv in October 2015.
 Ivan Mikhailovitch Tereshenko (1931–1990), son of Mikhail Ivanovitch Tereshchenko.
 Michel Tereshchenko, (b. 1956; Michel Terestchenko) French and English-born, grandson of Mikhail, son of Ivan Mikhailovitch Tereshenko, philosopher, university professor. 
 Ivan Tereshchenko, (b. 1958; Ivan Terestchenko) French and English-born, grandson of Mikhail, son of Ivan Mikhailovitch Tereshenko, photographer, plastician artist.
 Alexandra Tereshchenko, French-born, granddaughter of Mikhail, daughter of Ivan Mikhailovitch Tereshenko (+)
Fyodor Artemyevich Tereshchenko (1832–1896), whose collection served as the basis of the Kyiv Museum of Russian Art
Fyodor Fyodorovich Tereshchenko (1888–1954), an aircraft constructor and author, son of Fyodor Artemyevich. He was married to Beatrix Countess Von Keyserlingk. 
Their daughter Nathalie (Natacha) Tereshchenko married Prince Alexandre Alexandrovitch Schirinky-Schikhmatoff and had three daughters: Kyra, Irina, and Xénia

Coat of arms

References

Sources
M-a-k.net: Tereshchenko family tree and history
Oldkiev.info: Members of Tereshchenko dynasty
Любовь Болотина, "Династия Терещенко",  Удачный выбор, № 33, 01.04.2005.
Михаил Кутузов, "Терещенки", Со-общение, 2005.
Vitaliy Kovalynsky, "Aspiring the Common Good", Zerkalo Nedeli (The Mirror Weekly), March 1–7, 2003 — Russian, Ukrainian
Терещенко дал деньги на киевскую консерваторию. 120 лет назад родился бизнесмен и меценат Михаил Терещенко, Газета по-украински, 24.3.06.

 
Ukrainian noble families
Russian noble families